Common As Muck is an English comedy drama serial made by the BBC about the lives of a crew of binmen. It ran for two series. Both were nominated for a BAFTA Television Award for Best Drama Series.

Characters

Series One (1994)
The first series concentrated on the trials and tribulations of a team of bin men through a number of politically motivated moves by the local council to privatise the refuse collection of the fictional town in which the series is set. The main characters are pitched against the corrupt council leaders and are seen to be taken over by a contractor and ultimately triumphing over an increasingly corrupt management. The first series featured Tim Healy, whose character died in the penultimate episode and therefore did not appear in the second series.

 Episode One 7 September 1994
 Episode Two 14 September 1994
 Episode Three 21 September 1994
 Episode Four 28 September 1994
 Episode Five 5 October 1994
 Episode Six 12 October 1994

Series Two (1997)
The focus of the second series shifted away from the refuse disposal theme, with the opening episode showing the main characters being made redundant; subsequent episodes followed the lives of the characters, showing them experimenting with a number of different jobs including window cleaners, painters and decorators and in the case of Nev Smith coping with retirement after serving 45 years on the bins.  A number of new characters were introduced into the second series including those played by veteran actors Frank Finlay, Paul Shane and June Whitfield and a minor role for James Nesbitt as a parish priest. The Complete Series 2 DVD was released on 24 November 2014.

 Episode One 8 January 1997
 Episode Two 15 January 1997
 Episode Three 22 January 1997
 Episode Four 29 January 1997
 Episode Five 5 February 1997
 Episode Six 12 February 1997

Scheduling
Owing to the long period of time between the two series, the original series was repeated on BBC One in late 1996 immediately prior to the screening of the second series the following year. It was also repeated in full on UK Gold in 1999. The two series were also re-shown on the now-defunct satellite channel Granada Plus in 2002.

Filming locations
  Darnhill, Heywood, Rochdale 
 Newton Heath
 Miles Platting
 Shaw and Crompton (Series One)
 Oldham (Series One and Two)
 Blackpool (Series Two)
 Fleetwood (Series Two)
 Cleveleys (Series Two)
 Stalybridge (Hough Hill area used for Nev's retirement and Parade of Dustbin Trucks – Series 2 Episode 1)
 Whaley Bridge

Commercial release
Series One and Two are available to buy on DVD. Both boxsets were released in 2014, in March and November respectively.

External links

Common as Muck Official theme track

References 

1994 British television series debuts
1997 British television series endings
1990s British drama television series
BBC television dramas
English-language television shows
Television shows set in Manchester